Oliver Nightingale (born 3 July 1995) is a professional cricketer who plays for Guernsey. He played in the 2016 ICC World Cricket League Division Five tournament. He also represent Guernsey at the 2017 Island Games in swimming.

In April 2022, he was named in Guernsey's Twenty20 International (T20I) squad for the 2022 Spain Tri-Nation Series. He made his T20I debut on 29 April 2022, for Guernsey against Norway, in the opening match of the tri-series.

References

External links
 

1995 births
Living people
Guernsey cricketers
Guernsey Twenty20 International cricketers
Place of birth missing (living people)